Manku Ram Sodhi (1 August 1934, Village Sonabal Bastar district (Madhya Pradesh)) is a leader of Indian National Congress from Madhya Pradesh. He served as member of the Lok Sabha representing Bastar (Lok Sabha constituency). He was elected to 8th, 9th and 10th Lok Sabha.

References

India MPs 1991–1996
People from Bastar district
1934 births
Living people
India MPs 1989–1991
India MPs 1984–1989
Lok Sabha members from Madhya Pradesh
Madhya Pradesh MLAs 1980–1985
Madhya Pradesh MLAs 1962–1967
Madhya Pradesh MLAs 1972–1977
Madhya Pradesh MLAs 1977–1980
Indian National Congress politicians from Madhya Pradesh